United Nations Security Council resolution 1512, adopted unanimously on 27 October 2003, after recalling resolutions 955 (1994), 1165 (1998), 1329 (2000), 1411 (2002), 1431 (2002) and 1503 (2003) on Rwanda, the Council increased the number of temporary judges serving at the same time at the International Criminal Tribunal for Rwanda (ICTR) from four to nine.

The Security Council was convinced of the need to increase the powers of temporary judges at the ICTR so that they may adjudicate in pre-trial proceedings in other cases in addition to their own trials. Furthermore, the number of temporary judges appointed at any one time would also be increased to ensure the completion of all trial activities at first instance by the end of 2008. Acting under Chapter VII of the United Nations Charter, the relevant changes were made to the Statute of the ICTR.

See also
 List of United Nations Security Council Resolutions 1501 to 1600 (2003–2005)
 Rwandan genocide

References

External links
 
Text of the Resolution at undocs.org

 1512
2003 in Rwanda
 1512
October 2003 events